Yuanzhou District, formerly Guyuan, is a district and the seat of the city of Guyuan in the south of Ningxia, China, bordering Gansu province to the northeast.

History
Yuanzhou includes the old town of Guyuan or Guyuanzhou, which administered a prefecture in imperial times and a county before its urbanization.

Characteristics
Yuanzhou District administers eight towns, six townships, and one office. It is the economic, political, and transportation center of Guyuan. Although the district is located in Ningxia Hui Autonomous Region, the proportion of Hui residents is actually smaller than the proportion of Han Chinese. 80 percent of the district's residents are farmers. The district government is located on Government Street, and the district's postal code is 756000.

Administrative divisions
Yuanzhou County has 1 subdistrict 5 towns and 4 townships.
1 subdistrict
 Nanguan

5 towns
 Sanying
 Touying
 Pengbu
 Zhangyi
 Kaicheng

4 townships
 Zhaike
 Tanshan
 Hechuan
 Zhonghe

County-level divisions of Ningxia
Guyuan